Bancroft is a small, bowl-shaped impact crater located to the southwest of Archimedes on the Mare Imbrium. A wide, shallow depression runs from the rim of Bancroft southeast to the Montes Archimedes. There are some clefts at the edge of the mare to the west and southwest of the crater.  Other prominent craters are two small craters nearly to the west named Feuillée and Beer.

Bancroft has a linear ridge in the center of its floor, which is unusual for a crater of 13 km diameter.

It was named after American chemist Wilder D. Bancroft. Bancroft was previously identified as Archimedes A before being renamed by the IAU in 1976.

References

External links
 

Impact craters on the Moon
Mare Imbrium